Řepy is a district in the west of Prague, located in and making up most of Prague 17 district, part of Prague 6 administrative region.

Education

The Japanese School of Prague is in the district.

Neighbouring districts

References

Districts of Prague